Denis Grațian Haruț (born 25 February 1999) is a Romanian professional footballer who plays as a defender for Liga I club FCSB.

His first game in the Romanian Liga 1 came against FCSB.

Career statistics

Club 
Statistics accurate as of match played 5 February 2023.

Honours 
ACS Poli Timișoara
Cupa Ligii runner-up: 2016–17
FCSB
 Supercupa României runner-up: 2020

References

External links

1999 births
Living people
Sportspeople from Timișoara
Romanian footballers
Romania youth international footballers
Association football defenders
Liga I players
Liga II players
ACS Poli Timișoara players
FC Botoșani players
FC Steaua București players